Amirabad (also Romanized as Amīrābād) is a village in Howmeh Rural District, in the Central District of Bam County, Kerman Province, Iran. At the 2006 census, its population was 421, in 117 families.

References 

Populated places in Bam County